Benjamin Charles Hawkins a.k.a. "the Hawk" (March 22, 1944 – October 9, 2017) was a professional American football wide receiver most notably for the Philadelphia Eagles of the National Football League (NFL) from 1966 to 1973. He later played for the Cleveland Browns and the Philadelphia Bell of the World Football League (WFL). Hawkins led the NFL in receiving yards while with the Eagles in 1967. He played college football at Arizona State University and was drafted in the third round of the 1966 NFL Draft by the Eagles.  Hawkins was also selected in the fifth round of the 1966 AFL Draft by the New York Jets but opted to play in the NFL instead.

Born in Newark, New Jersey, Hawkins attended Weequahic High School before moving to nearby Nutley and transferring to Nutley High School. He had two children.

Hawkins died on October 9, 2017, at age 73.

References

1944 births
2017 deaths
Nutley High School alumni
People from Nutley, New Jersey
Weequahic High School alumni
Players of American football from Newark, New Jersey
American football wide receivers
Arizona State Sun Devils football players
Philadelphia Eagles players
Cleveland Browns players
Philadelphia Bell players